Charles Hermann Phillips (January 21, 1859May 24, 1938) was an American lawyer and Democratic politician in Milwaukee, Wisconsin.  He was a member of the Wisconsin State Senate from 1933 to 1937, representing Wisconsin's 6th State Senate district.  He was a son of Joseph Phillips, the 19th mayor of Milwaukee.

Background 
Phillips was born on January 21, 1859, in Milwaukee. Charles Phillips attended parochial and public schools and Markham Academy, and went on to the University of Wisconsin–Madison. From 1891 to 1895 he worked in the office of the Wisconsin Secretary of State. During this time he attended the University of Wisconsin Law School, graduating in 1893. For a time he worked with his father, and with a Milwaukee leather company, before going into the practice of law.   He served as chairman of the Milwaukee County Democratic Party County Committee, and was a delegate to the 1932 Democratic National Convention.

Elective office 
In 1932 Phillips challenged Socialist State Representative George Hampel who nominated to succeed the incumbent, fellow Socialist Thomas Duncan (who was not seeking re-election). After winning his party primary, Phillips, running on the Democratic ticket with Franklin D. Roosevelt narrowly defeated Hampel in a four-way race, with 14,485 votes for Phillips, 13,951 for Hampel, 8,433 for Republican George Becker, and 267 votes for former Republican State Representative Martin M. Higgins, who was running as an independent. He was assigned to the standing committee on state and local government, and became chairman of the committee in charge of Wisconsin's exhibit at the 1933-34 Chicago Centennial of Progress (world's fair). After the 1934 elections, he became chairman of the standing committee on the judiciary, and a member of the committee on legislative procedure.

In 1936, Phillips sought re-election, but was defeated in turn by George Hampel, who was running as a nominal Progressive under the Socialist/Progressive cooperation agreement then under effect, with 22,093 votes for Hampel, 14,136 for Phillips, and 4982 for Republican Salendon Bennett.

Personal life and family
Charles Phillips was the 3rd of nine children born to Joseph Phillips and his first wife, Mary Anne ( End).  Joseph Phillips was a prominent German Catholic immigrant businessman and flourished in the insurance industry.  He was elected to one term as mayor of Milwaukee and represented Milwaukee in the Wisconsin State Assembly for three years.

Charles Phillips married Helen Ramstack in 1884.  They had at least two children.

Charles H. Phillips died at age 79 on May 24, 1938.  He suffered an apparent heart attack while on his way home from work.  He was interred at Milwaukee's historic Calvary Cemetery.

Electoral history

Wisconsin Senate (1932, 1936)

| colspan="6" style="text-align:center;background-color: #e9e9e9;"| Democratic Primary, September 1932

| colspan="6" style="text-align:center;background-color: #e9e9e9;"| General Election, November 8, 1932

| colspan="6" style="text-align:center;background-color: #e9e9e9;"| Democratic Primary, September 1936

| colspan="6" style="text-align:center;background-color: #e9e9e9;"| General Election, November 3, 1936

References 

1859 births
1938 deaths
Politicians from Milwaukee
University of Wisconsin–Madison alumni
University of Wisconsin Law School alumni
Wisconsin lawyers
Democratic Party Wisconsin state senators
Lawyers from Milwaukee